Martin Malavé Dilan (born September 12, 1950) is a former member of the New York State Senate representing the 17th and 18th Senate Districts. The 18th Senate District encompasses the northern Brooklyn communities of Bushwick, Williamsburg, Greenpoint, Cypress Hills, City-Line, East New York, Bedford-Stuyvesant and Brownsville.

A Democrat, Dilan was a member of the New York City Council for 10 years. In 1994, Dilan voted for vacancy decontrol legislation; he later stated that he regretted his vote.

In November 2002, Dilan was elected to the New York State Senate. He served a total of eight terms in the Senate. Dilan voted in favor of the Marriage Equality Act in 2011 and voted for the gun control law known as the NY SAFE Act in 2013. On September 13, 2018, Dilan was defeated by Julia Salazar, a 27-year-old democratic socialist who ran an insurgent Democratic primary campaign against him.

Dilan's parents came to the United States from Puerto Rico. He resides in Bushwick. Dilan's son, Erik Martin Dilan, is a Democratic politician; as of January 2019, Erik Dilan represents the 54th District in the New York State Assembly.

External links
Senate biography
Senate legislation

References

Hispanic and Latino American state legislators in New York (state)
Democratic Party New York (state) state senators
New York City Council members
Living people
21st-century American politicians
1950 births
Politicians from Brooklyn
Hispanic and Latino American New York City Council members